The E.D. Edwards Power Plant is a coal-fired generating plant owned by Vistra Energy.  The plant, with a nameplate capacity of 780 megawatts, is connected with the high-tension power supply lines of Central Illinois.  It is located on the Illinois River and the Union Pacific Railroad, adjacent to the municipality of Bartonville.  The Edwards plant, built by the former Central Illinois Light Company (CILCO), began operations in 1960.  In the 2010s, asserting that the plant generated illegal levels of coal dust particulates and was nearing the end of its useful life, environmental groups headed by the Sierra Club and the Natural Resources Defense Council took legal action, starting in 2013, to shut it down.  In line with the terms of a settlement announced in September 2019  and approved by a federal court in November 2019, the plant is scheduled to close no later than December 31, 2022.  The closure will affect 70 jobs.

References
 

1960 establishments in Illinois 
Buildings and structures in Peoria County, Illinois
Coal-fired power stations in Illinois
Energy infrastructure completed in 1960
Vistra Corp